is a train station in Uminokuchi in the village of Minamimaki, Minamisaku District, Nagano Prefecture, Japan, operated by East Japan Railway Company (JR East).

Lines
Saku-Uminokuchi Station is served by the Koumi Line and is 39.7 kilometers from the terminus of the line at Kobuchizawa Station.

Station layout
The station consists of two opposed ground-level side platforms serving two tracks, connected to the wooden station building by a level crossing.  The station is unattended.

Platforms

History
Saku-Uminokuchi Station opened on 27 December 1932.  With the privatization of Japanese National Railways (JNR) on 1 April 1987, the station came under the control of JR East. The current station building was completed in 2012.

Surrounding area
Uminokuchi Post Office
Chikuma River

See also
 List of railway stations in Japan
Uminokuchi Station - a railway station on the Ōito Line, East Japan Railway Company (JR East), in Taira in the city of Ōmachi, Nagano Prefecture, Japan.

References

External links

 JR East station information 

Railway stations in Nagano Prefecture
Railway stations in Japan opened in 1932
Stations of East Japan Railway Company
Koumi Line
Minamimaki, Nagano